The Silent Night EP is a Christmas EP album by Seabird.  The EP was released on November 24, 2009. Their version of "Joy to the World" was featured on Grey's Anatomy.

Track listing
"Silent Night" (3:59)
"Joy to the World" (4:19)
"Don't You Know You're Beautiful" (3:32) (bonus track)

References

2009 EPs
Seabird (band) albums
Christmas EPs